In China, a megalopolis is a designation by the government to promote the development of a group of cities through transportation and communication links. The Economist Intelligence Unit in 2012 identified 13 megalopolises: Chang-Zhu-Tan (Greater Changsha), Chengdu, Chongqing, Greater Beijing i.e. Jing-Jin-Ji, Greater Shanghai (incl. Suzhou), Greater Xi'an, Greater Zhengzhou, Greater Guangzhou, Hefei economic circle (incl. Lu'an, Huainan, Chaohu), Shandong Peninsula, Greater Shenyang, Shenzhen and Wuhan.

Up to 2018, there are nine officially approved megalopolises in China. In 2017, the National Development and Reform Commission stated that plans for six city clusters had been completed in 2016, five in 2017, with eight more forthcoming for a total of 19 city cluster plans by 2020.  The new city clusters identified in 2017 were Lanzhou-Xining, Hohhot-Baotou-Ordos-Yulin, Guanzhong Plain, Western Taiwan Straits Economic Zone, and the Guangdong-Hong Kong-Macau Greater Bay Area.

Major Chinese megalopolises

See also 

 City proper
 Global city
 List of cities by population
 List of cities in the Far East by population
 List of country subdivisions by GDP over 100 billion US dollars
 List of largest cities
 List of metropolitan areas by population
 List of regions of China
 Megacity
 Megalopolis
 Metropolis
 Metropolitan area
 Urban area

References 

 
China
Regions of China
Lists of cities in China